Eigenmannia goajira is a species of glass knifefish found in the Lake Maracaibo basin in Colombia and Venezuela.

References

Sternopygidae
Freshwater fish of Colombia
Fish of Venezuela
Fish described in 1949